Wyndcliffe is the ruin of a historic mansion near Rhinebeck in Dutchess County, New York. The records at the Library of Congress state that the brick mansion was originally named Rhinecliff and constructed in 1853 in the Norman style. The mansion was built for New York City socialite Elizabeth Schermerhorn Jones (1810-1876) as a weekend and summer residence.  The design is attributed to local architect George Veitch.  A master mason, John Byrd, executed the highly varied ornamental brickwork using only rectangular and few molded bricks.

The adjacent hamlet to the north of Wyndcliffe was originally platted as "Kipsbergen" (1686); the hamlet was later renamed as "Rhinecliff" after the Jones-Schemerhorn estate of the same name.  Writer Edith Wharton was a frequent childhood visitor. The phrase "keeping up with the Joneses" is thought to originate from the Wyndcliffe estate.

In 1886, the mansion and land was sold by the executors of the will of Elizabeth S. Jones to Andrew Finck (1829-1890) for $25,000.  Wyndcliffe was later known as Linden Hall or Finck Castle, for those subsequent owners. Andrew Finck was a New York City brewer whose son August Finck (1854-1905) and grandson August Finck Jr. (1879-1915) operated one of the larger breweries in New York City.  A. Finck & Son's Brewery, 320-332 W. 39th St, Manhattan, NYC, produced Enterprise, a light lager beer from 1870 to 1911. Andrew Finck's nephew, John Henry Finck (1843-1881) operated a prosperous Feed and Flour business at 600 N. 11th Ave, Manhattan, NYC. Upon the death of Jacob Finck (1816-1880) (John's father/Andrew's brother), Andrew Finck, his son August Finck Sr, and grandson August Finck Jr were named executors of the Jacob Finck estate. They immediately closed the Feed and Flour business, leaving John Finck unemployed and penniless with a wife and 4 small children. Several months later, on 2 May 1881, John Finck committed suicide by hanging himself between two railroad cars. The mansion passed from Andrew to his son, August, in 1901 and then to his grandson, August Jr. Theodore Finck (1883-1923) purchased Wyndcliffe from his brother, August Jr's, estate in 1919 for $24,000. Theodore died in the mansion in 1923, identifying his daughter Anna Wolf Finck Rice (1879-1963) in his Last Will as his sole devisee. The mansion and 31.8 acres passed to Nissan S. Hanoka, Rebecca Hanoka and Mrs. Victori Hazen in 1927 for $100 plus a $5,000 mortgage. In 1934, the property was awarded back to Anna Wolf Rice for $1,117.94 at foreclosure auction, and then passed through several subsequent owners from 1936 onward.

The mansion was abandoned sometime around 1950. Originally situated on 80 acres including waterfront access to the Hudson River, the property was eventually reduced to 2.5 acres. Portions of the mansion have collapsed after nearly 70 years of abandonment. In 2003 the mansion was sold and the new owner erected a security fence around the property.  However the announced plans to restore the house never came to fruition. Images taken around that time showed that major sections of the second story had collapsed.

In September 2016 the house was sold for $120,000 at auction. The new buyer applied for, and was granted, a permit to demolish the remaining structure but did not carry that out. The structure was again sold in 2017 to a Manhattan-based developer.  In December 2022 a local news site reported that the developer had hired a structural engineer and submitted an emergency stabilization plan with Rhinebeck Planning Board.

Photos

References

External links

Historic information about the site is available at Historic American Buildings Survey:
 43 B&W photos
 3 color images
 3 measured drawings
 2 data pages

Houses in Rhinebeck, New York
Houses completed in 1853
1853 establishments in New York (state)
Neo-Norman architecture in the United States